Bolleville is a commune in the Seine-Maritime department in the Normandy region in northern France.

Geography
The A29 autoroute passes by on the northern border of the village.

Population

Places of interest
 The church of St.Pierre and St.Paul, dating from the thirteenth century.
 Two seventeenth century châteaux, at Beaunay and Calménil

See also
Communes of the Seine-Maritime department

References

Communes of Seine-Maritime